Bob Hicok (born 1960 Grand Ledge, Michigan) is an American poet.

Life
Hicok is a professor of creative writing at Virginia Tech. He is from Michigan and before teaching owned and ran a successful automotive die design business. He formerly taught at Western Michigan University.

His first book, The Legend of Light, was published by the University of Wisconsin Press and chosen as an American Library Association Booklist Notable Book of the Year. Plus Shipping followed in 1998. His 2001 Animal Soul was a finalist for the National Book Critics Circle Award. He has since published five more books, Insomnia Diary (2004) This Clumsy Living (2007) Words for Empty and Words for Full (2010) with University of Pittsburgh Press, Elegy Owed (2013) and Sex & Love & (2016) with Copper Canyon Press. His most recent book, Hold, was published in 2018 by Copper Canyon Press.  In 2004, after publishing four collections of poetry, Hicok (who previously had no undergraduate or graduate degree) earned an MFA from Vermont College of Fine Arts.

His poems have appeared in The Southern Review, The New Yorker, Poetry Magazine, The Paris Review and The American Poetry Review, as well as in eight volumes of The Best American Poetry and six times in the Pushcart Prize anthology.

Awards
 1995 Felix Pollak Prize for The Legend of Light chosen by Carolyn Kizer
 2008 Guggenheim Fellowship
 two NEA Fellowships
 2008 Rebekah Johnson Bobbitt National Prize for Poetry from the Library of Congress for "This Clumsy Living".
2013 National Book Critics Circle Award (Poetry) shortlist for Elegy Owed

Bibliography

Collections
Bearing Witness (Ridgeway Press, 1991)
The Legend of Light (University of Wisconsin Press, 1995)
Plus Shipping (BOA Editions, Ltd., 1998)
Animal Soul (Invisible Cities Press, 2003)
Insomnia Diary (University of Pittsburgh Press, 2004)
This Clumsy Living (University of Pittsburgh Press, 2007)
Words for Empty and Words for Full (University of Pittsburgh Press, 2010)
Elegy Owed (Copper Canyon Press, 2013)
Sex & Love & (Copper Canyon Press, 2016)
Hold (Copper Canyon Press, 2018)

Anthologies

List of poems

Notes

External links
"Bob Hicok", Caffeine Destiny
Is a Pepper Steak a Steak Made of Pepper? An interview with Bob Hicok
"Poet Hicok Reflects on Economic Hardships in Mich.",  April 30, 2009, Newshour, PBS
"Poets Q & A with Bob Hicok", August 2005, smartish pace
 Poem: The Smiths, as I understand them

1960 births
Living people
American male poets
Purdue University faculty
The New Yorker people
Virginia Tech faculty
Western Michigan University faculty
21st-century American poets
21st-century American male writers